Laklak is a Balinese traditional little pancake with grated coconut and melted palm sugar. This food is made of rice flour, water, coconut milk, suji leaf extract, baking powder, salt, grated coconut, and brown sugar.

See also

Apam balik
Bibingka
Burgo
Dadar gulung
Idli
Kue
List of Indonesian dishes
List of pancakes
Murtabak
Pannenkoek
Poffertjes
Roti canai
Roti jala
Serabi
Wingko

References

Indonesian pancakes
Foods containing coconut
Kue
Street food in Indonesia
Rice cakes